Llangattock-Vibon-Avel is a rural parish and former community, now in the community of Whitecastle in Monmouthshire, south-east Wales, in the United Kingdom.
Villages within the former community include Llangattock itself, Skenfrith, Rockfield, and Newcastle.

Name
The name means, in Welsh, "Saint Cadoc's church, of the sons (Meibion) of Abel", the latter part to distinguish the village from others in the area with dedications to Cadoc, such as Llangattock Lingoed. The local form, in the dialect of south east Wales, would have been Llangatwg F'ib'on Afel.

History
St Cadoc's Church is a Grade II* listed building.  Its tower dates in part from the 14th century, but the main part of the building was rebuilt in the 19th century by Thomas Henry Wyatt.

The church contains several brass and stone tablets dating from the early part of the 17th century, to the Evans family, formerly seated at Llangattock Manor. The church register dates from 1683.

The quiet south-facing graveyard contains five memorial tombs to members of the Rolls family, including Charles Rolls, of Rolls-Royce fame. The churchyard also contains a tall granite war memorial to men of the parish who fell in both World Wars.

Nearby Llangattock Manor was built on the site of an earlier house in 1877, for John Rolls, who later took the title of Baron Llangattock. It is also by Wyatt. Llangattock School, now known as Monmouth Montessori School, is a Montessori school and nursery housed in a school building commissioned by John Rolls at the same time as the manor house, for the children of workers on the family's estate.  The Rolls of Monmouth golf club is based nearby at The Hendre, which was the main seat of the Rolls family.

Llanfaenor
Two miles (3.2 km) to the northwest of the village, at Llanfaenor, is an ancient chapel of ease, restored in 1859, and consisting of chancel, nave, south porch and a western turret originally containing one small bell. In 1987 the chapel was converted to a private residence, retaining many of the original features.

References

External links 
 Llangattock-Vibon-Avel at GENUKI
 Kelly's Directory of Monmouthshire 1901
 Listed Buildings in Llangattock-Vibon-Avel

Villages in Monmouthshire
Former communities in Monmouthshire